Missing You... is a 2008 Singaporean romance cum drama film about the highs and lows of the Singaporean getai trade. Directed by Lin Kun Hui, the film stars Joshua Ang, Christina Lim, Dasmond Koh, Hsu Chiung Fang and John Cheng.

Plot
When Zhen (Christina Lim) was young, her grandmother used to bring her to getai shows hosted by getai icon Fang (Hsu Chiung Fang), who now faces spouse abuse behind the glorious front. Zhen grew up to be a pretty and kind hearted lady who displayed an aloof attitude towards men. With a passion in singing, her childhood dream was to perform for her grandmother at a getai show. Qiang (Joshua Ang), a blue collar worker who washes cars for a living likes Zhen but feels inferior because of his livelihood. Oblivious to Qiang's pursuit, Zhen falls for Simon but being a Casanova, he soon leaves Zhen for another woman. Thereafter, Qiang realized that he suffers from a terminal illness but perseveres to fulfill Zhen's wish of singing at the getai show and ends up sacrificing his own life...

Cast
Dasmond Koh as Simon
Joshua Ang as Qiang
Christina Lim as Zhen

References

Singaporean romantic drama films
2008 films
2000s Mandarin-language films